Nyctaegeria is a monotypic moth genus in the family Sesiidae erected by Ferdinand Le Cerf in 1914. Its only species, Nyctaegeria nobilis, was first described by Herbert Druce in 1910. It exists in Angola and Tanzania.

References

Sesiidae
Insects of Angola
Insects of Tanzania
Moths of Africa
Moths described in 1910